K series may refer to:

Lincoln K series, a line of luxury vehicle
Scania K series, a series of bus chassis with longitudinal rear-mounted engines
Skoda K series, a heavy howitzer
K series engine (disambiguation)
International Harvester K and KB series, a line of heavy trucks of the 1940s
QI (K series), the eleventh series of quiz show QI
Sony Ericsson K series, a series of cell phones
K-series (trains), a type of train in China
"K" series, a set of messages in the military Variable Message Format data protocol
K Series (TV series), a television programming block on Puthuyugam TV
K Series, a series of bullion coins produced by Korea Minting and Security Printing Corporation

See also
 J series (disambiguation)
 L series (disambiguation)